Fairy of the Chalice is a television series broadcast on MediaCorp TV Channel 8 in 2006.

Synopsis

Lady Nuwa (Liu Jie) imprisons an evil scorpion spirit, Wu Gong Jing within a chalice and instructs a young fairy (known as Fairy Bei, or Fairy of the Chalice) to guard it. But in her moment of carelessness, Wu Gong Jing manages to escapes. Lady Nuwa punishes Fairy Bei by bounding to the chalice because Wu Gong Jing  trick Fairy Bei and escape from the chalice. Fairy Bei has to serve 1000 masters and to grant three wishes to anyone in the mortal world before freeing from the chalice. She is in the possession of many masters until in the hand of the father of Zheng Feng, who retains Fairy Bei for over 9 years. Zheng Feng's ex-servant, Cao Jing, becomes the villain of the story. Zheng Feng and his other, faithful servant, Qi Cheng (which means 70%) become involved between the battle between the Hunter's Tribe and Sheng Nu Guo (The Land of Sacred Women). Fairy Bei realizes that this problem is too much for Zheng Feng to handle himself and tries to help him, but only makes the situation worse. Her past of serving masters is what causes the main issue.

Names
Cantonese Juytping:

Cast
Roger Kwok
Zhang Ting
Liu Tao
Christopher Lee
Zhao Zi Cun
Yvonne Lim

External links
 https://web.archive.org/web/20071214221607/http://8.mediacorptv.sg/shows/drama/view/781/1/.html

Singapore Chinese dramas
Fantasy television series
2006 Singaporean television series debuts
2006 Singaporean television series endings
Channel 8 (Singapore) original programming